Tu Youyou (born 30 December 1930) is a Chinese pharmaceutical chemist and malariologist. She discovered artemisinin (also known as) and dihydroartemisinin, used to treat malaria, a breakthrough in twentieth-century tropical medicine, saving millions of lives in South China, Southeast Asia, Africa, and South America.

For her work, Tu received the 2011 Lasker Award in clinical medicine and the 2015 Nobel Prize in Physiology or Medicine jointly with William C. Campbell and Satoshi Ōmura. Tu is the first Chinese Nobel laureate in physiology or medicine and the first female citizen of the People's Republic of China to receive a Nobel Prize in any category. She is also the first Chinese person to receive the Lasker Award. Tu was born, educated and carried out her research exclusively in China.

Early life 
Tu was born in  Ningbo, Zhejiang, China, on 30 December 1930.

She attended Xiaoshi Middle School for junior high school and the first year of high school, before transferring to Ningbo Middle School in 1948. A tuberculosis infection interrupted her high-school education, but inspired her to go into medical research. From 1951 to 1955, she attended Peking University Medical School / Beijing Medical College. In 1955, Youyou Tu graduated from Beijing Medical University School of Pharmacy and continued her research on Chinese herbal medicine in the China Academy of Chinese Medical Sciences. Tu studied at the Department of Pharmaceutical Sciences, and graduated in 1955. Later Tu was trained for two and a half years in traditional Chinese medicine.

After graduation, Tu worked at the Academy of Traditional Chinese Medicine (now the China Academy of Traditional Chinese Medical Sciences) in Beijing.

Research career 
Tu carried on her work in the 1960s and 70s, including during China's Cultural Revolution.

Schistosomiasis 
During her early years in research, Tu studied Lobelia chinensis, a traditional Chinese medicine believed to be useful for treating schistosomiasis, caused by trematodes which infect the urinary tract or the intestines, which was widespread in the first half of the 20th century in South China.

Malaria 

In 1967, during the Vietnam War, President Ho Chi Minh of North Vietnam asked Chinese Premier Zhou Enlai for help in developing a malaria treatment for his soldiers trooping down the Ho Chi Minh trail, where a majority came down with a form of malaria which is resistant to chloroquine. Because malaria was also a major cause of death in China's southern provinces, especially Guangdong and Guangxi, Zhou Enlai convinced Mao Zedong to set up a secret drug discovery project named Project 523 after its starting date, 23May 1967.

In early 1969, Tu was appointed head of the Project 523 research group at her institute. Tu was initially sent to Hainan, where she studied patients who had been infected with the disease.

Scientists worldwide had screened over 240,000 compounds without success. In 1969, Tu, then 39 years old, had an idea of screening Chinese herbs. She first investigated the Chinese medical classics in history, visiting practitioners of traditional Chinese medicine all over the country on her own. She gathered her findings in a notebook called A Collection of Single Practical Prescriptions for Anti-Malaria. Her notebook summarized 640 prescriptions. By 1971, her team had screened over 2,000 traditional Chinese recipes and made 380 herbal extracts, from some 200 herbs, which were tested on mice.

One compound was effective, sweet wormwood (Artemisia annua), which was used for "intermittent fevers," a hallmark of malaria. As Tu also presented at the project seminar, its preparation was described in a 1,600-year-old text, in a recipe titled, "Emergency Prescriptions Kept Up One's Sleeve". At first, it was ineffective because they extracted it with traditional boiling water. Tu discovered that a low-temperature extraction process could be used to isolate an effective antimalarial substance from the plant; Tu says she was influenced by a traditional Chinese herbal medicine source, The Handbook of Prescriptions for Emergency Treatments, written in 340 by Ge Hong, which states that this herb should be steeped in cold water. This book instructed the reader to immerse a handful of qinghao in the equivalent of 0.4 litres of water, wring out the juice, and drink it all. After rereading the recipe, Tu realised the hot water had already damaged the active ingredient in the plant; therefore she proposed a method using low-temperature ether to extract the effective compound instead. Animal tests showed it was completely effective in mice and monkeys.

In 1972, she and her colleagues obtained the pure substance and named it qinghaosu (青蒿素), or artemisinin in English. This substance has now saved millions of lives, especially in the developing world. Tu also studied the chemical structure and pharmacology of artemisinin. Tu's group first determined the chemical structure of artemisinin. In 1973, Tu was attempting to confirm the carbonyl group in the artemisinin molecule when she accidentally synthesized dihydroartemisinin.

Tu volunteered to be the first human test subject. "As head of this research group, I had the responsibility" she said. It was safe, so she conducted successful clinical trials with human patients. Her work was published anonymously in 1977. In 1981, she presented the findings related to artemisinin at a meeting with the World Health Organization.

For her work on malaria, she was awarded the Nobel Prize in Medicine on 5 October 2015.

Later career 
Tu Youyou was promoted to Researcher (the highest researcher rank in mainland China equivalent to the academic rank of a full professor) in 1980, shortly after the beginning of the Chinese economic reform in 1978. In 2001, she was promoted to academic advisor for doctoral candidates. As of 2023, she is the chief scientist of the China Academy of Chinese Medical Sciences.

As of 2007, her office is in an old apartment building in Dongcheng District, Beijing.

Before 2011, Tu Youyou had been obscure for decades, and is described as "almost completely forgotten by people".

Tu is regarded as the "Three-Without Scientist" – no postgraduate degree (there was no postgraduate education then in China), no study or research experience abroad, and not a member of either of the Chinese national academies, the Chinese Academy of Sciences and Chinese Academy of Engineering. Tu is now regarded as a representative figure of the first generation of Chinese medical workers since the establishment of the People's Republic of China in 1949.

Awards and honours 
 1978, National Science Congress Prize, P.R. China
 1979, National Inventor's Prize, P.R. China
 1992, (One of the) Ten Science and Technology Achievements in China, State Science Commission, P.R. China
 1997, (Two of the) Ten Great Public Health Achievements in New China, P.R. China
 2009, Cyrus Tang Traditional Chinese Medicine Award winner
 September 2011, GlaxoSmithKline Outstanding Achievement Award in Life Science
 September 2011, Lasker-DeBakey Clinical Medical Research Award
 November 2011, Outstanding Contribution Award, China Academy of Chinese Medical Sciences
 February 2012, (One of the Ten) National Outstanding Women, P.R. China (March 8th Red Banner Pacesetter)
 June 2015, Warren Alpert Foundation Prize (co-recipient)
 October 2015, Nobel Prize in Physiology or Medicine 2015 (co-recipient) for her discoveries concerning a novel therapy against malaria, awarded one half of this prize; and William C. Campbell and Satoshi Ōmura jointly awarded another half for their discoveries concerning a novel therapy against infection with roundworm parasites.
 2016, Highest Science and Technology Award, China
 2019, Order of the Republic, China

See also 

 Drug discovery
 Malaria, quinine and tropical medicine
 Antimalarial medications resulted from Project 523 (during and after the Cultural Revolution)
Artemisinin (major contributors: Tu Youyou et al., 1972)
 Dihydroartemisinin (Tu Youyou et al., 1973)
 Pyronaridine (1973)
 Artemether (Zhou Weishan, 1975)
 Lumefantrine (1976)
 Artesunate (Liu Xu, 1977)
 Artemether/lumefantrine (Zhou Yiqing, 1985)
 Naphthoquinone (1986)
 History of science and technology in the People's Republic of China
 First artificial synthesis of (crystallized bovine) insulin (Niu Jingyi et al., 1965)
 Discovery of using arsenic trioxide and tretinoin to treat leukemia (Zhang Tingdong, Wang Zhenyi, Chen Zhu & Chen Saijuan)
 Dr Tang Feifan, discoverer of Chlamydia trachomatis, was expected to receive a Nobel Prize but died from political persecution in Beijing, 1958
 Dr Wu Lien-teh, first Chinese nominated to receive a Nobel Prize in Physiology or Medicine (nominated in 1935)
 List of Chinese Nobel laureates and List of female Nobel laureates
 List of Chinese discoveries and List of Chinese inventions
 Chinese herbology and Traditional Chinese medicine
 Timeline of women in science

Notes

References

Further reading

External links 

 

1930 births
Living people
Biologists from Zhejiang
Chemists from Zhejiang
Chinese medical researchers
Chinese women chemists
Chinese chemists
Educators from Ningbo
Malariologists
Nobel laureates in Physiology or Medicine
Nobel laureates of the People's Republic of China
Peking University alumni
Recipients of the Lasker-DeBakey Clinical Medical Research Award
Recipients of the Order of the Republic (China)
Scientists from Ningbo
Women Nobel laureates